The Proto-Albanian language is the unattested language from which Albanian later developed. Albanian evolved from an ancient Paleo-Balkan language, traditionally thought to be Illyrian, or otherwise a totally unattested Balkan Indo-European language that was closely related to Illyrian and Messapic, which is sometimes also referred to as Albanoid.

Proto-Albanian is reconstructed by way of the comparative method between the Tosk and Gheg dialects, as well as the treatment of loanwords, the most important of which are those from Latin (dated by De Vaan to the period 167 BCE to 400 CE) and from Slavic (dated from 600 CE onward). The evidence from loanwords allows linguists to construct in great detail the shape of native words at the points of major influxes of loans from well-attested languages.

Proto-Albanian is broken up into different stages which are usually delimited by the onset of contact with different well-attested languages. Its earliest stages are dated to the early Roman Empire, just before the period of intense Latin-Albanian contact, while in its late stages it experienced contact with Slavic languages. The Tosk-Gheg split is known to predate Slavic contact circa 600 CE, as evidenced by the fact that Latin and ancient Greek loanwords are treated like native words with regard to taxonomical differences between Gheg and Tosk, but the same is not true of Slavic loans.

Nomenclature of periodization of Proto-Albanian

Vladimir Orel distinguishes the following periods of Proto-Albanian:

 Early Proto-Albanian (EPA): spoken before the 1st century CE, when Albanian had not yet acquired extensive influence via language contact from Latin/Proto-Romance
 Late Proto-Albanian (LPA): after extensive Latin contact, with the end of the period seeing contacts between ancient Slavic idioms still close to the Proto-Slavic language, in the 6th and 7th centuries CE. During this period the structure of Proto-Albanian was "shattered" by major changes.

However, another periodization paradigm does exist, and is used by some scholars in the field, such as Ranko Matasović:

 Pre-Proto-Albanian: essentially equivalent to Vladimir Orel's "Early Proto-Albanian", except that the newer paradigm of Matasović dates Latin/Albanian contact a century earlier, and thus it ends for Matasović in the 1st century BCE rather than the 1st century CE. After this period ends, Latin contact begins to transform the language. 
 Early Proto-Albanian : corresponds to the earlier phases of what is for Orel "Late Proto-Albanian". For Matasović, the period spans the 1st century BCE to the 6th century CE, halting before contact with Slavic idioms begins.
 Late Proto-Albanian: includes the last two centuries of LPA for Orel, plus most of the unattested period of Old Albanian, halting before Turkish influence begins. Note that, in this paradigm, Gheg and Tosk split from Early Proto-Albanian, not Late Proto-Albanian, consistent with our knowledge that the split preceded Slavic contact.
 Early Albanian: corresponds to the late, Ottoman, phase of Old Albanian in the traditional paradigm, ending in 1800, at which point it transitions to Modern Albanian.

Demiraj, like Matasović and unlike Orel, observes the 5th/6th centuries as a boundary between stages, but instead places the "emergence of Albanian" from its parent after this point, rather than the 14th.

In an Albanian chapter penned by Michiel de Vaan within Klein, Joseph and Fritz' 2018 Handbook of Comparative and Historical Indo-European Linguistics, Demiraj's periods are adhered to. Orel's "Later Proto-Albanian", which is for them also definitively placed before Slavic contact, is referred to as simply "Proto-Albanian" (PAlb) or, in German, Uralbanisch, reflecting the terminology of earlier writing in German. What is for Orel "Early Proto-Albanian" (EPA), dated definitively before the onset of Latin contact, is for De Vaan, "Pre-Proto-Albanian" (PPAlb); in German, this stage is called Voruralbanisch or Frühuralbanisch. De Vaan also discusses the possibility of breaking Pre-Proto-Albanian into two stages: one before the first Greek loanwords, and one that is after the first Greek loanwords, but before contact with Latin.

This page at present is using the paradigm of Orel.

History of study
Vladimir Orel is one of the main modern international linguists to have dealt with the passage from Proto-Indo-European to Proto-Albanian to Modern Albanian. According to Orel, the study of Proto-Albanian syntax remains in its infancy so there are some limitations to the work. However, there have been developments in the understanding of the historical development of phonetics and vocabulary.
Other major work has been done by Eqrem Çabej and Shaban Demiraj as well as by major scholars in the field of Romanian historical linguistics as it relates to Albanian (see Albanian–Romanian linguistic relationship) as well as other Balkan linguists. A large amount of work done on Proto-Albanian is published in German, rather than English.

Phonology

Extensive recent studies on Proto-Albanian phonology have been published by Huld (1984), Beekes (1995), Shaban Demiraj (1996), Bardhyl Demiraj (1997), Orel (2000), Hock (2005), Matzinger (2006), Vermeer (2008), Schumacher (2013), and De Vaan (2018).

At present, this page follows Orel's paradigm for periods of Proto-Albanian, and presents the relationship between the synchronic phonologies of both "EPA" and "LPA" with diachronic relationships to each other and to ancestral Indo-European forms as well as descendant Albanian forms.

Stress
In Early Proto-Albanian, stress was paradigmatic, and behaved according to morphological class, with a base on the first syllable. In different paradigms, the stress pattern was varyingly barytonic, oxytonic, and mobile. Unstressed vowels lost one mora—long vowels were shortened, already short vowels were often deleted. In Later Proto-Albanian, however, a new system of unstressed vowel reduction emerged where *a reduced to *ë while all others were simply deleted (except for post-tonic inlaut vowels, which became *ë). Orel gives the following examples:

 EPA * "ram" (sg) > *dauš > ... > modern dash
 EPA * "rams" (pl) > *dauši > ... > modern desh
 EPA * "branch" (sg) > *déga > ... > modern degë
 EPA * "branches" (pl) > *dégai > ... > modern degë

Vowels

Early Proto-Albanian possessed four distinctive short vowels: *a, *e, *i and *u.  Proto-Indo-European *o and *ə had merged into *a by the Early Proto-Albanian stage. A five-way distinction was maintained for long vowels: *aː, *eː, *iː,  *oː and *uː. Early Proto-Albanian also had four diphthongs: *ei, *ai, *eu and *au.

Early Proto-Albanian's vowel inventory began to change as a result of Latin contact. Initially Albanian was resistant to the restoration of short *o as a separate phoneme, with Latin unstressed *o being replaced by *a, and stressed Latin *o being replaced by *u. However, in later loans, Latin *o is maintained in Albanian as *o. Additionally, some Latin loans with short *u saw Latin *u replaced by *o, as well as *ə specifically in unstressed positions before sonorants. In two cases, Orel argues that Latin short /u/ was lengthened in Albanian to /u:/, ultimately to render /y/. On the other hand, whatever effect Ancient Greek loanwords had at their time of absorption is unclear, but diachronically the vowels always agree with regular internal Albanian developments.

   

Late Proto-Albanian

Late Proto-Albanian exhibited *a, *i and *u throughout its development as distinctive short vowels. *o was restored to the phonemic inventory as a result of loanwords where it was increasingly maintained instead of replaced. Although *e was eliminated by breaking to *ie (which would render je and ja), it was restored by the leveling of /ai/ to /e/ and other phenomena that replaced /a/, /ie/, and /ue/ with /e/. The only long vowel preserved in its original form was *iː. *o: was replaced by *ue, *eː was merged into *aː and both were rounded and eventually raised to *o, while *uː merged with the diphthong *ui, ultimately rendering *y. By Late Proto-Albanian, all the original Indo-European diphthongs had now leveled, but new diphthongs were absorbed in loans, and were also innovated by breaking phenomena: *ie, *ue and *ui. *ai in Latin words with AE shared the fate of inherited Early Proto-Albanian *ai, becoming *e, while Latin AU similarly shared the fate of inherited *au and became *a.

Phonemically nasal vowels emerged in Late Proto-Albanian. First, all vowels standing before nasal consonants were nasalized. The following nasal consonant was then lost in certain morphological contexts, while the vowel remained nasalized, resulting in the emergence of LPA phonemes denoted *â, *ê, *î, and *û. Except in certain Gheg varieties, *ê merged into *â. The traditional view presented by Orel and Desnickaja is that distinctive nasalization was lost by Tosk but retained by Gheg and that this is a taxonomical difference between the two. However this has now been challenged, after Sheper and Gjinari discovered Lab dialects (Lab is a subdialect of Tosk) in the Kurvelesh region that still had distinctive nasal vowels, and Totoni likewise found that the Lab speech of Borsh also still has nasal vowel phonemes. This means that, instead of the traditional view, it is possible that denasalization happened in most Tosk dialects only after the split from Gheg.

Slavic *uː appears to still have been back and round when it was loaned into Albanian, but it is after the diphthongization and resulting fronting of the original Early Proto-Albanian *uː to *y was no longer absorbing new *uː segments, as they are, with only three exceptions, reflected as *u. Slavic *o had already become *a in the Slavic languages that contacted Albanian by the time of contact, and was loaned as *a for the most part; as is reflected also in other non-Slavic languages absorbing these words. After /v/, this *a became *o again in two attested cases: kos ("yogurt", from Proto-Slavic *kvasъ) and vorbë ("clay pot").

It was at the end of the LPA period that length became no longer distinctive in Albanian, although many Gheg and some Lab dialects preserved it and/or re-innovated it. Furthermore, by Old Albanian, all diphthongs had been lost: those ending in -i were all leveled, the -u was lost in those ending in -u, and those ending in -e were converted to glide + vowel sequences; further changes including the frequent effacement of the former first element or otherwise its hardening into an occlusive (typically /v/ for former u-, and gj /ɟ/ for former i-) rendering the former presence of a diphthong rather opaque in many reflexes.

Diachronic development 
Note that this table differentiates short vowels form long vowels with the IPA symbol <ː> being applied to the long vowels.

Specifically contextualized reflex results are placed in parentheses.

Development of Indo-European sonorants
The nasal sonorants *n̩ and *m̩ both rendered Early Proto-Albanian *a, which remains *a in modern Albanian (PIE *g'hn̩taː "goose" > EPA *gataː > modern Albanian gatë "heron").
Like EPA *a elsewhere, in some cases it was raised to *e, as seen in PIE *ln̩gwh- > EPA *laga > Albanian lehtë (suffixed with -të).

Consonants

Classification & isoglosses with other branches of Indo-European
The closest language to Albanian is Messapic, with which it forms a common branch titled Illyric in Hyllested & Joseph (2022). Hyllested & Joseph (2022) in agreement with recent bibliography identify Greco-Phrygian as the IE branch closest to the Albanian-Messapic one. These two branches form an areal grouping - which is often called "Balkan IE" - with Armenian. Shortly after they had diverged from one another, Greek, Armenian, and partly Albanian undoubtedly also underwent a longer period of contact (as can be seen, for example, in the irregular correspondence: Greek σκόρ(ο)δον, Armenian sxtor, xstor, and Albanian hudhër, hurdhë "garlic"). Furthermore, intense Greek–Albanian contacts certainly occurred thereafter, and ongoing connections between them have been in the Balkans from the ancient times, continuing up to the present-days. 

Hyllested & Joseph (2022) identify the highest shared number of innovations between (Proto-)Albanian and (Proto-)Greek. A common Balkan Indo-European root *aiğ(i)- ("goat") can be reflected in Albanian edh ("goat, kid") < PAlb *aidza and dhi ("nanny goat) < PAlb *aidzijɑ̄ with Greek αἴξ ("goat", gen. αἰγός) and Armenian ayc ("(nanny) goat"). It has been noted that the Balkan IE root and all the alleged Balto-Slavic and Indo-Iranian roots with a meaning "goat" are likely to be not Proto-Indo-European, as they may all originate as independent and relatively early, post-PIE borrowings, from the substrate languages spoken by the sedentary farmers who were encountered by immigrating Indo-European pastoralists. The view of a substrate borrowing can be corroborated by areal words for "goat" in other IE languages, such as Gothic gaits ("goat") and Latin haedus ("kid"), reflecting *gʰaid̯(-o)-, considered as a substrate word usually linked with Semitic languages (cf. Akkadian gadû, Aramaic gaδiā ̄"kid"). However it was most likely not directly borrowed from Semitic, but from a European substrate language that in turn had loaned the word from a common third source. Hence it can be viewed as an old cultural word, which was slowly transmitted to different European languages, and then adopted by the newcoming Indo-European speakers. Within this scenario it should be remarked the exclusive sharing of a common proto-form between Albanian, Greek, and Armenian, which could have been borrowed at a pre-stage that was common to these languages. Specifically Indo-Iranian/Greek/Albanian and Greek/Armenian/Albanian isoglosses are both relatively rare, examples including ndaj (to divide; Indo-Greek-Albanian) and ëndërr ("dream"; Greek/Armenian/Albanian).  Whereas Armenian/Albanian isoglosses are "insignificant", there are a considerable number of Indo-Iranian/Albanian isoglosses, which are notably often connected with horses, horse tending, and milk products.

The deictic element *k'jā- in PPAlb *k'jā-dīti > Albanian sot ("today") has the same source as *kjā- in Proto-Greek *kjā-wētes (cf. Mycenean Greek za-we-te, Attic Greek τῆτες, and Ionic Greek σῆτες "this year"). These words are built combining the deictic element and a form of the word for "day" in Albanian (PPAlb *dīti-) and for "year" in Greek (PGk *wētes-). The deictic element resulted from a reanalysis of the word for "today" *kjāmer-, which contains the restricted word for "day" *āmer- (cf. Gk ἡμέρα, Doric Greek ἁμέρα, and Armenian awr). In PPalb only later the word āmer- was replaced by *dīti-, when the latter became the usual word for day in this language. Another remarkable Greek/Albanian isogloss is a very ancient form for "hand": *mər-, cf. the Albanian verb marr ("hold") and the Greek márē ("hand"), and also Greek márptō ("grab").

In older literature, Orel (2000) argues that Albanian has a large number of isoglosses that are common to Albanian, Germanic, Baltic and Slavic, as part of a "North Eastern" lexical grouping, with a large number of these referring to wood or objects made out of wood. Orel (1998) noted 24 isoglosses between Balto-Slavic and Albanian, 48 common words between Baltic and Albanian and 24 between Albanian and Slavic. Hyllested & Joseph (2022) review Orel's common items and argue that a substantial number don't have convincing etymologies or do not constitute isoglosses between Balto-Slavic and Albanian. An example is Albanian murg (dark) and Lithuanian margas (colourful) which Orel considers to be isoglosses but both are equally related to Proto-Germanic *murkaz, ancient Greek amorvos and Proto-Slavic *mergъ.

Orel identifies only one Albanian/Italic/Celtic isogloss, blertë ("green"), cognate to Latin flōrus ("bright") and Irish blár ("gray"). Specifically Celtic/Albanian vocabulary was previously thought to be limited although including at least one core vocabulary item (hënë "moon", cognate to Welsh cann "white" and Breton cann "full moon"), but recent work by Trumper in 2018 has proposed a larger though still not overwhelming set, with the notable addition of dritë ("light").

Although knowledge of Tocharian is fragmentary, the one known Albanian/Tocharian isogloss is "very important" as noted by Orel: kush ("who", cognate to Tocharian A kus, with the same meaning).

Relation to Modern Albanian

References

Notes

Citations

Bibliography 

 

Indo-European linguistics
Paleo-Balkan languages
Albanian language
Albanian